Arnstein Finset (born 8 July 1947) is a Norwegian medical psychologist currently at University of Oslo and the Editor-in-Chief of Elsevier's Patient Education and Counseling.

Finset was born in Øvre Eiker. He took his cand.psychol. degree at the University of Oslo in 1974 and the dr.philos. degree in 1989.

References

1947 births
Living people
Academic staff of the University of Oslo
Norwegian psychologists
People from Øvre Eiker